"New York Groove" is a song written by English musician and producer Russ Ballard. The song was covered by rock band Hello in 1975 and later by Ace Frehley (formerly of Kiss) for his 1978 solo album. Frehley's version is the best-known version of the song.

Hello version 
British glam rock band Hello first recorded the song in 1975, for their debut album, Keeps Us Off the Streets.

The song was a number nine hit in the UK, and subsequently reached number seven in Germany.

Ace Frehley version 
Ace Frehley, best known as the lead guitarist of Kiss, recorded "New York Groove" for his first solo album, Ace Frehley, released in 1978; the album was released concurrently with solo albums from the other three Kiss members: Peter Criss, Gene Simmons and Paul Stanley. Frehley originally "scoffed" at the idea of the remake, but co-producer Eddie Kramer persisted. It was released as a single and the song made it to No. 13 on the Billboard Hot 100, by far the highest-charting single from any of the four solo albums. Frehley once told Rolling Stone magazine that his unique take on the song was inspired by his experience with hookers in New York City's Times Square in the 1970s.

"New York Groove" was performed on Kiss's tours of 1979 and 1980, and became a staple of Frehley's shows during his solo tours in the 1980s and 90s, and again during the Reunion Tour when he rejoined Kiss in 1996.

A live version of the song can be found on the Japanese version of the 1996 Kiss album You Wanted the Best, You Got the Best!! (and the U.S. vinyl version) recorded in Sydney, Australia in 1980, which would also make it one of the few live recordings released by the group to feature longtime drummer Eric Carr.

Personnel on Ace Frehley version 
Ace Frehley – all guitars, bass, lead vocals
Anton Fig – drums, percussion
David Lasley, Don Yowell and Susan Collins – backing vocals
Bobby McAdams – power mouth (talk box)

Chart history

Weekly charts

Year-end charts 

Hello original

Ace Frehley cover

Other versions 
"New York Groove" is the opening track on the 2012 Andy Scott's Sweet album New York Connection. This version fuses Jay-Z and Alicia Keys' song "Empire State of Mind" (another ode to New York city), into the chorus.

Soundtrack appearances 

The Ace Frehley recording appears in the following films:
 Idle Hands (1999)
 Los Enchiladas! (1999)
 A Guide to Recognizing Your Saints (2006)
 The documentary Inside Job (2010)
 Top Cat: The Movie (2011)
 Blood Ties (2013)
 Thought Crimes: The Case of the Cannibal Cop (2015)
 Weiner (2016)
 American Animals (2018)

"New York Groove" has also been used on television:
 It was played at the end of the 10th episode of season 4 of the TV show Entourage.
The Ace Frehley recording was played in the 12th episode of season 3 of the TV show Californication.
 It was the opening theme for the first two seasons of the American cable television reality series NY Ink.
 It has been played on USA Network in a promo for the series White Collar.
 It was played in the 8th episode of season 5 of the HBO TV show Girls as Hannah Horvath and her boyfriend Fran leave New York in an RV.
 It was the opening theme for NBC's The Blacklist Season 5, Episode 1.
 It was used during WWE's Wrestlemania 34 as the official promotional theme for the upcoming Wrestlemania 35.

AT&T also used the Hello version of "New York Groove" in a 2012 commercial.

The Hello version of "New York Groove" was also used in commercials promoting New York state's economic recovery following the COVID-19 pandemic in 2021.

The original version by Hello is featured in the video game Grand Theft Auto IV on the in-game radio station Liberty Rock Radio, as well as being one of four songs to play during the end credits after the games theme played.

The Ace Frehley version was among songs proposed by James Gunn for use with the Guardians of the Galaxy in Avengers: Infinity War. In a deleted scene, Star-Lord and Drax argue about the song.

Other Usages 

The New York Mets play "New York Groove" immediately following a victory at Citi Field.

The New York Giants use "New York Groove" at home games after scoring a touchdown as well as Super Bowl XXXV, Super Bowl XLII and Super Bowl XLVI. The New York Boulders use this song as their victory song as well.

A sample of the song's main riff and rhythm (1975 Hello version) was used by the Argentine rock band Soda Stereo for their song "Zoom" from the album Sueño Stereo in 1995. The lyrics for "Zoom" were written by Gustavo Cerati.

The Iona Gaels (since 2005) and New York City Football Club (since 2016) use "New York Groove" after winning home games.

The song has been used as the background promotional music for the 2014 and 2015 TCS New York City Marathons.

Stephen King uses the song as the title to a chapter in Wolves of the Calla, book V of his dark fantasy The Dark Tower series, where the characters Jake Chambers and Eddie Dean briefly return to New York City by means of magical muffinballs, and the characters also allude to the song in free indirect speech. As Jake was "drawn" into the world of the Dark Tower from the NYC of 1977, he is most likely referring to the Hello version.

The film Golden Exits (2017) begins with a character singing the song.

Ace Frehley performed the song live at the beginning of the 2018 NHL Winter Classic between the Buffalo Sabres and New York Rangers at Citi Field in New York City. The song was played as the Sabres and Rangers took the ice.

References 

Kiss (band) songs
1975 singles
1978 singles
Songs written by Russ Ballard
Songs about New York City
Casablanca Records singles
1975 songs